The ancient universities of Scotland are medieval and renaissance universities that continue to exist in the present day. The majority of the ancient universities of the British Isles are located within Scotland, and have a number of distinctive features in common, being governed by a series of measures laid down in the Universities (Scotland) Acts 1858–1966. The Universities (Scotland) Act 1966 uses the term 'older universities' to refer to St Andrews, Glasgow, Aberdeen and Edinburgh. The same act provided for the independence from St Andrews of Dundee, which was then granted a similar form of governance under its royal charter.

In common with the other ancient universities of the United Kingdom, the Scottish ancients find themselves administered in a quite different fashion from these new universities (of which there are now fifteen in Scotland) and are granted a number of privileges as a result of their different status. The ancient universities are part of 27 culturally significant institutions recognised by the British monarchy as Privileged bodies of the United Kingdom.

Background

Following the creation of the ancient universities before the end of the 16th century, no other universities were formed in Scotland until the twentieth century. The first 'new university' of the era was the University of Strathclyde which received its royal charter in 1964, although it traces its origins back to the Andersonian Institute (also known at various times as Anderson's College and Anderson's University) founded in 1796.

Members
Most sources cite four ancient universities of Scotland which are, in order of foundation:
 University of St Andrews – founded 1413 
 University of Glasgow – founded 1451
 University of Aberdeen – founded 1495 (see below)
 University of Edinburgh – founded 1583

St Andrews

The University of St Andrews traces its origin to a society formed in 1410 by Laurence of Lindores, archdeacon Richard Cornwall, bishop William Stephenson and others. Bishop Henry Wardlaw (died 1440) issued a charter in 1411 and attracted the most learned men in Scotland as professors. In 1413 Avignon Pope Benedict XIII issued six bulls confirming the charter and constituting the society a university.

All of the ancient universities with the exception of St Andrews were both universities and colleges, with both titles being used. However the University of St Andrews was a traditional collegiate university with a number of colleges. Today, only two statutory colleges exist: United College and the much smaller St Mary's College for students of theology.

In 1897 a third college was created when University College Dundee (founded in 1891) was incorporated and absorbed into St Andrews University (1897). University College subsequently became Queen's College (1954). In 1978 Queen's College separated from the University of St Andrews to become the independent University of Dundee. A fourth non-statutory college, St Leonard's College was founded in 1972 using the name of an earlier institution as a formal grouping of postgraduate students. In 2022 the university announced its intention to found New College, which would form a new hub for the schools of international relations, management, and finance and economics.

Glasgow

The University of Glasgow was founded in 1451 by a papal bull of Pope Nicholas V, at the request of King James II, giving Bishop William Turnbull permission to add the university to the city's cathedral. Notably, the university has been without its original Bull since 1560, when then-chancellor Archbishop James Beaton took it to France during the Scottish Reformation, where it was lost sometime during the subsequent 150 years.

Aberdeen

No college is mentioned in the foundation bill, only a university and it was the "University of Aberdeen" by that name which was established in 1495. Subsequently, a single college, originally known as St. Mary of the Nativity, was established (it was founded by William Elphinstone, Bishop of Aberdeen, who drafted a request on behalf of King James IV to Pope Alexander VI which resulted in a papal bull being issued). Soon the entity came to be called King's College, after its royal founder James IV.

A separate university (Marischal College) was founded in 1593. In 1860, King's merged with Marischal College. While both institutions were universities and would be considered ancient, the Act of Parliament uniting the two specified that the date of the foundation of the new united university would be taken to be that of the older King's College.

Aberdeen was highly unusual at this time for having two universities in one city: as 20th-century university prospectuses observed, Aberdeen had the same number as existed in England at the time (the University of Oxford and University of Cambridge). In addition, a further university was set up to the north of Aberdeen in Fraserburgh from 1595, but was closed down about a decade later. A further institute that was established in 1750 under the wishes of Robert Gordon, a wealthy University of Aberdeen alumnus has since evolved into the modern Robert Gordon University.

Edinburgh

Founded by the Edinburgh Town Council, the university began as a college of law using part of a legacy left by a graduate of the University of St Andrews, Bishop Robert Reid of St Magnus Cathedral, Orkney. The university was established by a royal charter granted by James VI in April 1582, and instruction began under the charge of theologian Robert Rollock in October 1583. As the first Scottish university to be founded by royal charter at the urging of the 'town council and burges of Edinburgh', rather than through papal bulls as had been the case for the three older universities, this set a new precedent. Despite this difference, it is universally considered one of the seven ancient universities of Britain and Ireland (and ten years older than the youngest ancient university, the University of Dublin), a status affirmed by the Scottish Government.

Anomalies

University of Dundee
The University of Dundee gained independent university status by Royal Charter in 1967, having previously been a college of the University of St Andrews. While not governed by the Universities (Scotland) Acts, the institution's Royal Charter provided for it to adopt the characteristics of ancient university governance such as the academic senate, awarding the undergraduate MA degree and electing a Rector.

As a consequence, some sources have grouped the University of Dundee among the ancient universities. The label has also been used by the university itself.

At the installation of the university's Rector in 2007, the Principal and Vice Chancellor Sir Alan Langlands addressed the issue, noting:

University of Aberdeen

Despite being held as an ancient university, the University of Aberdeen was only created in 1860. The university was formed by the amalgamation of two existing ancient universities within Aberdeen, which were:
 University and King's College of Aberdeen; founded 1495
 Marischal College and University of Aberdeen; founded 1593

The two universities, generally known simply as King's College and Marischal College, were united into the modern University of Aberdeen by the Universities (Scotland) Act 1858. The Act of Parliament uniting the two universities specified that the date of the foundation of the new united university would be taken to be that of the older King's College, 1495. Another, short-lived, university existed in the Aberdeenshire town of Fraserburgh from 1595 to 1605.

In modern times, former college names may refer to specific university buildings, such as the King's College and Marischal College buildings in Aberdeen, the Old College and New College at Edinburgh and the 'Old College' to refer to the former buildings of the University of Glasgow before its move in the 19th century to Gilmorehill.

Undergraduate Master of Arts degree

The ancient universities are distinctive in offering the Magister Artium/Master of Arts (M.A.) as an undergraduate academic degree. This is sometimes known as the Scottish MA, though it is offered by fewer than a third of Scotland's Universities.

Universities (Scotland) Acts

The Universities (Scotland) Acts created a distinctive system of governance for the ancient universities in Scotland, the process beginning with the 1858 Act and ending with the 1966 Act. Despite not being founded until after the first in these series of Acts, the University of Dundee shares all the features contained therein.

As a result of these Acts, each of these universities is governed by a tripartite system of General Council, University Court, and Academic Senate.

The chief executive and chief academic is the University Principal who also holds the title of Vice-Chancellor as an honorific.  The Chancellor is a titular non-resident head to each university and is elected for life by the respective General Council, although in actuality a good number of Chancellors resign before the end of their "term of office".

Each also has a students' representative council (SRC) as required by statute, although at the University of Aberdeen this has recently been renamed, the Students' Association Council (the Students' Association having been the parent body of the SRC).

Present

Student body

In the 2021-22 academic year, 112,615 students were enrolled at the four institutions: 44,735 were from Scotland (39.7%), 22,325 from the rest of the United Kingdom (19.8%) and 45,555 were from overseas (40.5%).

The Scottish Government places a cap on the number of undergraduate places available for Home-domiciled students and as a result, entry to the universities are competitive with all four universities placing within the top 10 of British universities by student entry tariff.

Funding and finances

The total annual income for the ancient universities for 2021–22 was £2.75 billion of which £631.8 million was from research grants and contracts, with an operating deficit of £247.8 million. The universities hold a total endowment value of £938 million and net assets of £4.17 billion. £508.4 million was received from the Scottish Funding Council via grants and £110.2 million was received from tuition fees of Scotland-domiciled students. Further tuition fees of £142.9 million was received from students from the rest of the United Kingdom and £787 million was received from overseas students. The table below is a record of each ancient universities' financial data for the 2021–22 financial year:

By figures

By percentage

Rankings

In the 2023 national league table rankings, the ancient universities of Scotland are placed within the top twenty in both of The Guardian University Guide and in The Times/Sunday Times Good University Guide. In the 2023 global rankings, three of the ancient universities featured in the world's top 200 universities in both of the QS and the Times Higher Education World University Rankings.

Criticism
The ancient universities are criticised for not attracting more students from disadvantaged backgrounds. Scottish students represent about 48 per cent of the undergraduate population at the four ancient universities, over half of whom have been educated at independent schools in Scotland (26 per cent of the total student body) when such students make up just over 4 per cent of the total school-age population in Scotland. In addition, fewer than one in seven students (13 per cent) at the
four ancient universities in Scotland are from working-class backgrounds. Half of Scotland’s top media professionals and 46 per cent of the country’s MPs attended the four ancient universities leading to concerns they are not representative, credible and that talent is wasted. 

For the 2016-17 admissions cycle, Ancient universities were criticised for the number of clearing places they had for Scottish students. Edinburgh offered 130 courses to students from the rest of the United Kingdom, but only one to Scottish students. Similarly, Aberdeen only offered one course in clearing for Scottish students but 79 for the rest of the UK, while Glasgow offered 5 and 497 courses respectively. St Andrews did not participate in clearing and offered no courses to either Scottish students or students from the rest of the UK.

See also
List of universities in Scotland
Ancient universities
List of oldest universities in continuous operation
Medieval university
Ancient university governance in Scotland
Medieval university (Asia)
Red Brick universities
Plate glass universities

References

 
Scotland in the Late Middle Ages
Lists of universities and colleges in the United Kingdom